Adenylyl cyclase type 7 is an enzyme that in humans is encoded by the ADCY7 gene.

Function 

This gene encodes a membrane-bound adenylyl cyclase that catalyses the formation of cyclic AMP from ATP and is inhibitable by calcium. The product of this gene is a member of the adenylyl cyclase class-4/guanylyl cyclase enzyme family that is characterized by the presence of twelve membrane-spanning domains in its sequences.

References

External links

Further reading

EC 4.6.1